"Engaged" is the twenty-third single by Japanese recording artist Alisa Mizuki. It was released on February 6, 2008, nearly two years and a half since "C'est la Vie" (2005) and five years since her last solo single "Shout It Out" (2003). The single was issued in two formats: CD+DVD edition and CD-only edition.

CDJournal described "Engaged" as a "captivating ballad" and praised the intensity and emotion of Mizuki's vocal delivery. The B-side, "Anemone," was also produced by Takigawa but written by Mizuki, marking her first foray into songwriting since the song "Sky" from Mizuki's fourth compilation album History: Alisa Mizuki Complete Single Collection (2004).

Chart performance 
"Engaged" debuted on the Oricon Daily Singles chart at number 43 on February 5, 2008 and climbed to number 40 on February 9, 2008. It peaked at number 53 on the Oricon Weekly Singles chart with 2,147 copies sold in its first week. The single charted for eight weeks and has sold a total of 7,562 copies.

Track listing

Charts

References 

2008 singles
Alisa Mizuki songs
Japanese television drama theme songs
2008 songs